Events from the year 1957 in art.

Events
 April 19 – Picasso is introduced by American photographer David Douglas Duncan to his dachshund Lump who becomes Picasso's companion and subject in paintings.
 May 17 – First known instance of a chimpanzee (Congo) painting. His mentor Desmond Morris organises an exhibition of chimpanzee art at the Institute of Contemporary Arts in London.
 Hungarian National Gallery opens in Buda Castle, Budapest.
 Gruppe SPUR, an artistic collaboration, is founded in Germany.
 Chicago's Lithuanian community opens the Čiurlionis Art Gallery.
 John Lennon enrols at Liverpool College of Art where he will meet Stuart Sutcliffe.
 Man Ray's Object to Be Destroyed (1923) is destroyed
 Three new neo-grotesque sans-serif typefaces are released: Folio (designed by Konrad Bauer and Walter Baum), Neue Haas Grotesk (designed by Max Miedinger) and Univers (designed by Adrian Frutiger); all will be influential in the International Typographic Style of graphic design.

Awards
 Archibald Prize: Ivor Hele – Self Portrait
 John Moores Painting Prize: Jack Smith – Creation and Crucifixion

Exhibitions
 January – Yves Klein – Proposte Monochrome, Epoca Blu ("Proposition Monochrome; Blue Epoch"), Gallery Apollinaire, Milan.

Works

 Jean Arp – Evocation of a Form: Human, Lunar, Spectral (cast bronze)
 Maurice Boitel – The Hens
 Paul-Émile Borduas – Étoile noire
 Arthur Boyd – Dreaming Bridegroom 1
 Yves Klein – Aerostatic Sculpture (Paris).
 L. S. Lowry – Man Lying on a Wall; Portrait of Ann
 Isamu Noguchi – Endless Coupling
 Pablo Picasso – Las Meninas
 Charles Sheeler – Red Against White
 Clyfford Still – 1957-D No. 1

Births
 January 27 – Frank Miller, American comic-book artist
 April 3 – Yves Chaland, French cartoonist (d. 1990)
 May 4 – John Akomfrah, Ghanaian-born British filmmaker
 July 31 – Martin Jennings, English figurative sculpture
 August 7 – Mark Bagley, American comic-book artist
 August 9 – Rick Leonardi, American comic-book illustrator
 August 28 – Ai Weiwei, Chinese installation artist
 October 16 – Jim Hodges, American installation artist
 November 18 – Ernst Billgren, Swedish sculptor
 November 26 – Félix González-Torres, Cuban artist (d. 1996)
 undated
 Bill Barker, American Schwa conceptual artist
 Mike Bernard, English painter and multi-media artist
 Wang Chiu-chiang, Chinese shan-shui artist

Deaths
 January 1 – Óscar Domínguez, Spanish painter (b. 1906)
 January 13? – Saishū Onoe, Japanese poet and calligrapher (b. 1876)
 January 17 – Jože Plečnik, Slovene architect (b. 1872)
 January 20 – John Minton, English painter and illustrator (suicide) (b. 1917)
 February 4 – Miguel Covarrubias, Mexican painter and caricaturist (b. 1904)
 February 11 – Gwen Raverat, English wood engraver (b. 1885)
 February 14 – Emanuel Hahn, German Canadian sculptor (b. 1881)
 March 16 – Constantin Brâncuși, Romanian-born sculptor (b. 1876)
 March 28 – Jack Butler Yeats, Irish painter and illustrator (b. 1871)
 March 23 – Andrzej Wróblewski, Polish figurative painter (mountaineering accident) (b. 1927)
 May 14 – Marie Vassilieff, Russian-born painter (b. 1884)
 May 18 – Bruce Rogers, American book designer and typographer (b. 1870)
 June 12 – Mario Urteaga Alvarado, Peruvian painter (b. 1875)
 July 7 – Kiyoshi Koishi, Japanese photographer (b. 1908)
 August 2 – Lasar Segall, Lithuanian-born Brazilian Jewish painter (b. 1891)
 August 15 – C. T. Loo, Chinese-born art dealer (b. 1880)
 August 19 – David Bomberg, English painter (b. 1890)
 September 13 – Adam Emory Albright, American painter of figures in landscapes (b. 1862)
 September 26 – Pompeo Coppini, Italian American sculptor (b. 1870)
 October 11 – René Auberjonois, Swiss Post-Impressionist painter (b. 1872)
 October 15 – Henry van de Velde, Belgian-born painter, architect and designer, a founder of the Art Nouveau movement (b. 1863)
 October 24 – Christian Dior, French fashion designer (b. 1905)
 November 2 – Mahonri Young, American sculptor (d. 1877)
 November 20 – Mstislav Dobuzhinsky, Russian-born graphic artist (b. 1875)
 November 24 – Diego Rivera, Mexican painter (b. 1886)
 November 30 – Paja Jovanović, a leading Serbian Realist painter (along with Đorđe Krstić and Uroš Predić) (b. 1859)
 December 14 – Josef Lada, Czech illustrator and painter (b. 1887)
 December 15 – Heinrich Hoffmann, German propaganda photographer (b. 1885)

See also
 1957 in Fine Arts of the Soviet Union

References

 
Years of the 20th century in art
1950s in art